Darren Elias (born November 18, 1986) is an American professional poker player who holds the record for most World Poker Tour titles, with four.

Early life and online poker
Elias was born in Boston and now lives in Medford, New Jersey. He was an ocean lifeguard in Myrtle Beach, South Carolina before he became a professional poker player. Elias attended the University of Redlands in Redlands, California where he graduated with a bachelor's degree in Creative Writing in 2008.  

In addition to his successes in live poker, he has also done well in online poker, winning over $8 million online. He played under the username "darrenelias" on Pokerstars and Full Tilt Poker, where he won two World Championship of Online Poker (WCOOP) titles and an FTOPS title.

Live poker tournaments
As of 2022, Elias has live tournament winnings of over $10,700,000.  His cashes on the World Poker Tour make up over $4,600,000 of his total winnings.

World Poker Tour

References

1986 births
American poker players
World Poker Tour winners
People from Boston
People from Cherry Hill, New Jersey
Living people